Anomis illita, known generally as the okra leafworm or illita anomis moth, is a moth species in the family Erebidae. It is found in North America.

The MONA or Hodges number for Anomis illita is 8551.

References

Further reading

 
 
 

Scoliopteryginae
Articles created by Qbugbot
Moths described in 1852